Haskell is a city in central Haskell County, Texas, in the United States. As of the 2010 census, the city population was 3,322. It is the Haskell county seat.

Geography

Haskell is located at  (33.160152, –99.734572). U.S. Route 277 passes through the east side of the city, leading northeast  to Wichita Falls and south  to Abilene. U.S. Route 380 runs through the center of Haskell as North 1st Street, leading east  to Denton and west  to Post.

Haskell County Courthouse

The Haskell County Courthouse was completed in 1892 and was designed and built by A.O. Watson. The east and west wings were added in 1930–1931. It is one of the oldest courthouses still in use in the area.

Government
Haskell is the county seat of Haskell County.

Demographics

2020 census

As of the 2020 United States census, there were 3,089 people, 1,043 households, and 730 families residing in the city.

2010 census
At the 2010 census, there were 3,322 people, an increase of 6.95% since 2000 (216 people). The racial makeup of the town was 80.40% White (2,671 people), 4.94% African American (164 people), 0.75% Native American (25 people), 0.75% Asian (25 people), 10.69% from other races (355 people), and 2.47% from two or more races (82 people). Hispanic or Latino of any race were 26.76% of the population (889 people).

2000 census
At the 2000 census there were 3,106 people, 1,295 households, and 868 families living in the city. The population density was 912.8 people per square mile (352.7/km). There were 1,526 housing units at an average density of 448.5 per square mile (173.3/km).  The racial makeup of the city was 80.33% White, 3.90% African American, 0.55% Native American, 0.10% Asian, 12.46% from other races, and 2.67% from two or more races. Hispanic or Latino of any race were 22.70%.

Of the 1,295 households 29.7% had children under the age of 18 living with them, 53.8% were married couples living together, 10.1% had a female householder with no husband present, and 32.9% were non-families. 31.3% of households were one person and 20.5% were one person aged 65 or older. The average household size was 2.32 and the average family size was 2.91.

The age distribution was 25.2% under the age of 18, 5.7% from 18 to 24, 22.5% from 25 to 44, 20.6% from 45 to 64, and 25.9% 65 or older. The median age was 42 years. For every 100 females, there were 83.5 males. For every 100 females age 18 and over, there were 80.7 male.

The median household income was $20,740 and the median family income  was $27,109. Males had a median income of $20,245 versus $15,391 for females. The per capita income for the city was $13,114. About 21.5% of families and 28.7% of the population were below the poverty line, including 42.4% of those under age 18 and 18.1% of those age 65 or over.

Education
The City of Haskell is served by the Haskell Consolidated Independent School District.

Notable people
 Ralna English, singer
 D.H. Hamilton, Confederate soldier, farmer, former member of the Texas House of Representatives, and judge; ancestor of Rick Perry
 John Kimbrough, football player, actor and former member of the Texas House of Representatives
 Anita Thigpen Perry, former First Lady of Texas
 Rick Perry, United States Secretary of Energy, former Governor of Texas and candidate for president in 2012 and 2016
 Larry D. Thomas, 2008 Texas State Poet Laureate

Climate
The climate in this area is characterized by hot, humid summers and generally mild to cool winters.  According to the Köppen Climate Classification system, Haskell has a humid subtropical climate, abbreviated "Cfa" on climate maps.

References

External links
City of Haskell official website

Cities in Haskell County, Texas
Cities in Texas
County seats in Texas